A. R. MacNeill Secondary School is a secondary school in Richmond, British Columbia, Canada.  As of January 2023, there are approximately 790 students attending the school.  It is in School District 38 Richmond.  The school was built at a cost of over CAD 25 million. The feeder elementary schools are Anderson, Cook, Talmey and Tomsett.

The school is named after Allan Roy MacNeill.

In addition to being one of the youngest schools in the district, it is also known to pilot and test any new ideas before they are applied to the rest of the schools in Richmond. Due to this specialized program, Macneill has been ranked as one of the most efficient schools in all of Greater Vancouver.

History
A.R MacNeill opened on September 2, 2003. In its first year, it was home to about 200 students and staff. The school also began with only two grade levels, 7 and 8, and as each year passed it added another grade. The first senior class graduated in 2008.

2006-2007
In the 2006/2007 school year, students entering grade 10 were removed from their respective academies and put into what was called the Transition Academy. This new academy was created to emphasize and educate students about graduation requirements, such as the recent Graduation Portfolio and post-secondary and career options.

2008-2009
In the 2008/2009 school year, MacNeill stopped accepting grade 7 students due to low enrollment and completely discontinued the arts and science academy options. MacNeill began using an electronic attendance system called BCeSIS and a new schedule management software.

Timetable
Students at MacNeill take eight courses over the period of two days (Day 1 & Day 2). Each "day" consists of four 65-75-minute periods, a 15-minute break, 20-minute advisory (homeroom), and lunch. Wednesdays and Thursdays, there is Personalised Learning Time (PLT), each course is 65-minutes long, and advisory is omitted. Students' timetables on all days of the week start at 8:30 a.m. and end at 3:00 p.m.

Athletics
A.R. MacNeill competes in the RSSAA leagues and enters teams in all of the traditional fall, winter and spring sport seasons. The following sports are available:

Fall
 Girls' Volleyball
 Boys' Volleyball (Junior & Senior)
 Boys' Soccer (Senior)
 Cross Country
 Swimming

Winter
 Girls' Basketball
 Boys' Basketball
 Table Tennis
 Curling

Spring
 Boys' Volleyball (Grade 8 & 9)
 Girls' Soccer
 Badminton
 Golf
 Tennis
 Track & Field
 Ultimate

Clubs
The school has a variety of clubs, covering a vast number of subjects from arts to humanitarianism.

Active clubs (2014/15)

Inactive clubs
The following clubs are not active as of the 2014/15 school year:

See also
Richmond, BC
School District 38 Richmond
Public School

References

B.C. government capital projects inventory

External links
Official web site
School reports - Ministry of education
 Class Size
 Satisfaction Survey
 School Performance
 Skills Assessment
 Enrollment Reports

Educational institutions established in 2003
High schools in Richmond, British Columbia
2003 establishments in British Columbia